Yücel is a male Turkish name meaning exalted. It is used as a first name and a last name.

Given name
 Mustafa Yücel Özbilgin (1942–2006), Turkish supreme court magistrate
 Yücel Gündoğdu (born 1985), Turkish karateka
 Yücel İldiz (born 1953), Turkish football manager
 Yücel Uyar (born 1960), Turkish football manager and former footballer

Surname
 Can Emre Yücel (born 1983), Turkish football player
 Can Yücel (1926–1999), Turkish poet
 Deniz Yücel (born 1973), German-Turkish journalist
 Emrah Yucel (born 1968), Turkish designer of film and television posters
 Hasan Âli Yücel (1897–1961), former minister of national education of Turkey
 Keklik Yücel (born 1968), Dutch politician of Turkish descent
 Kenan Yücel (born 1974), Turkish poet and writer.
 Mert Yücel, Turkish musician
 Nedim Yücel (born 1979), Turkish basketball player
 Uğur Yücel (born 1957), Turkish actor, film director and producer

Given names
Turkish-language surnames
Turkish masculine given names